An advisory referendum on the European Economic Community was held in Italy on 18 June 1989, alongside European elections. The non-binding referendum was called by all main parties with a special law, because the Italian Constitution does not allow this type of question. The Italian political spectrum wanted to re-affirm the popular support of Italy to the process of European integration, particularly giving to the European Parliament a popular, constitutional mandate in event of a future European Constitution.

Result

References

1989
1989 referendums
1989 elections in Italy
Referendums related to the European Union
June 1989 events in Europe
Treaty on European Union
1989 in the European Economic Community